Waterloo, also known as Grady House, is a historic plantation house located near Albertson, Duplin County, North Carolina. It was built about 1806, and is a two-story, three bay by two bay, Federal style frame dwelling. It sits on a brick pier foundation and has a steep gable roof.  The house is surrounded on three sides by a one-story enclosed shed. Also on the property is a contributing two-room outbuilding.

It was listed on the National Register of Historic Places in 1975.

References

Plantation houses in North Carolina
Houses on the National Register of Historic Places in North Carolina
Federal architecture in North Carolina
Houses completed in 1806
Houses in Duplin County, North Carolina
National Register of Historic Places in Duplin County, North Carolina